Senad Jahić (born 13 May 1987) is a Slovenian football defender.

References

External links
NZS profile 

1987 births
Living people
Slovenian footballers
Association football fullbacks
NK Rudar Velenje players
NK Krško players
Slovenian PrvaLiga players